White Mountains may refer to:

Mountain ranges
Afghanistan and Pakistan
White Mountains (Spīn Ghar)
Australia
White Mountains National Park, in Queensland
Greece
White Mountains (Lefka Ori), on the island of Crete
United States
White Mountains (Alaska)
White Mountains (Arizona)
White Mountains (California) and partly in Nevada
White Mountains (New Hampshire), a range of mountains that extends into Maine
White Mountain National Forest
White Mountains Region, a tourist region that encompasses the New Hampshire mountain range

In fiction
The White Mountains, the first novel in The Tripods trilogy by author John Christopher; the titular mountains are the Alps.
The White Mountains (Middle-earth), of J.R.R. Tolkien's Middle-earth

Companies
 White Mountains Insurance Group

See also
 White Mountain (disambiguation)
 White Hills (disambiguation)
 Sierra Blanca (disambiguation)